The Unknown Ranger is a 1936 American Western film directed by Spencer Gordon Bennet and starring Bob Allen, Martha Tibbetts, and Walter Miller. It was released on October 30, 1936.

Cast list
 Bob Allen as himself
 Martha Tibbetts as Alice
 Walter Miller as Bull
 Buzz Henry as Buzzy (credited as Buzzy Henry)
 Bud Osborne as Steve
 Robert Kortman as Toady (credited as Bob Kortman)
 Harry Strang as Snaky Joe
 William Gould as Harper (credited as Bill Gould)
 Horace Murphy
 Al Taylor

References

American Western (genre) films
1936 Western (genre) films
1936 films
American black-and-white films
1930s English-language films
Films directed by Spencer Gordon Bennet
1930s American films